Helen McLean (born 1927) is a Canadian author and painter, known for her autobiographical Details From a Larger Canvas.

Life

Helen McLean was born in Toronto, Ontario, in 1927.
As a teenager in 1940 she studied under Dorothy Stevens at an art class arranged by the Women's Art Association.
She attended the University of Toronto, where she earned a B.A., and gained an M.A at the University of Calgary.
She married Ross McLean, and had three children.
Helen McLean  became an artist, writer, art critic, and teacher.

Helen McLean has written two autobiographical books, Sketching from Memory: A Portrait of My Mother (1994) and Details from a Larger Canvas (2001).
Her second book describes her struggles against the expectations she had set for herself, or that had been set for a woman by her family or society.
Her 1998 novel Of all the Summers describes the experiences of a woman, Rachel, during different periods of her life.
Rachel is now in mid-life and is rediscovering herself. The lyrical novel recalls her earlier relationships and work.
McLean's 2003 novel Significant Things was short-listed for the 2004 Commonwealth Writers Prize Best Book Award, Caribbean and Canada Region.

Paintings

McLean's paintings have been exhibited widely in Canada.
They are held in private and corporate collections that include the Bank of Canada in Ottawa. 
Her portrait of Margaret Laurence hangs in the Margaret Laurence Home in Neepawa, Manitoba.

Publications

McLean has published articles, essays and reviews in The Globe and Mail, the National Post, Brick, Quill & Quire, Books in Canada, the Literary Review of Canada, Room of One's Own and Ars Medica.
McLean's published books include:

 (autobiography)

References
Citations

Sources

1927 births
Possibly living people
Canadian women novelists
20th-century Canadian novelists
Canadian literary critics
Women literary critics
Canadian women essayists
20th-century Canadian women writers
21st-century Canadian women writers
20th-century Canadian painters
21st-century Canadian painters
University of Toronto alumni
University of Calgary alumni
21st-century Canadian novelists
Writers from Toronto
Artists from Toronto
20th-century Canadian women artists
21st-century Canadian women artists
20th-century Canadian essayists
21st-century Canadian essayists